Winterbourne is a village and civil parish in the Berkshire Downs about  north of Newbury in West Berkshire.

Geography
Winterbourne has a site of Special Scientific Interest (SSSI), called Winterbourne Chalk Pit and another on its western border called Snelsmore Common

Parish church
The Church of England parish church of Saint James was completely redeveloped in the 18th and 19th centuries. The north chapel was added in 1712 and the bell tower in 1759. The architect J.W. Hugall rebuilt the nave in 1854 and a Mr. Hudson restored the chancel in 1895. Hudson retained the chancel's 14th-century east window, and an earlier lancet window in the south wall. The building is Grade II* listed.

Civil War
Winterbourne and the surrounding area had an eventful Civil War. Donnington Castle was damaged by cannon; the First and Second Battles of Newbury were fought nearby. On 26 October 1644, Cromwell stayed the night in the Blue Boar public house in the north of the parish and his forces camped at North Heath. In July that year, his forces had taken on Prince Rupert and company at Ripley in Yorkshire, during which a successful (for the Parliamentarians) skirmish, they stole a statue of a wild boar that Lord Ingleby had brought back from Italy as one of a pair. The other remains in Ripley Castle. The blue boar was left at the pub,  now The Crab Hotel.

Transport
Bus travel from Newbury is provided by Newbury and District service 5A, twice daily on weekdays.

References

Sources

External links

Civil parishes in Berkshire
Villages in Berkshire
West Berkshire District